We Are the Living is a 1933 collection of short stories by Erskine Caldwell, comprising some of this writer's earlier works.

Style
The stories are of different characters, some obviously intended as humorous or satirical while others are lyrical, romantic and/or tragic. Most of them are laid against the background of the lives of ordinary people in the contemporary US South, the social milieu most familiar to the author - some being specifically located in his home state of Georgia.

Contents
The stories in the book include:
 "Warm River"
 "We Are Looking at You, Agnes"
 "The People's Choice"
 "Indian Summer"
 "Rachel"
 "The Medicine Man"
 "Picking Cotton"
 "Meddlesome Jack"
 "The Picture"
 "Yellow Girl"
 "August Afternoon"
 "Mama's Little Girl"
 "The First Autumn"
 "After-Image"
 "Crown-Fire"
 "The Empty Room"
 "Over the Green Mountains"
 "The Grass Fire"
 "A Woman in the House"
 "Country Full of Swedes"

External links
 Cover of the first edition

1933 short story collections
American short story collections
Viking Press books
Works by Erskine Caldwell